Lindsay Davenport and Lisa Raymond were the defending champions, but they chose not to participate this year.

Seeds

Draw

External links
Draw

Regions Morgan Keegan Championships
Cellular South Cup - Doubles
Cellular South Cup - Doubles
U.S. National Indoor Championships